Cantoria is a municipality of Almería province, in the autonomous community of Andalusia, Spain.

Demographics

References

External links
  Cantoria - Sistema de Información Multiterritorial de Andalucía
  Cantoria - Diputación Provincial de Almería
  Cantoria Information - General Information about Cantoria

Municipalities in the Province of Almería